Robert Alfred Lees (born 25 October 1952) is a South African politician who has been a Member of Parliament (MP) for the Democratic Alliance (DA).

Career 
He was a member of the Shadow Cabinet of Mmusi Maimane. He sits on the Standing Committee on Public Accounts.

References 

Living people
1952 births
White South African people
Members of the National Assembly of South Africa
Democratic Alliance (South Africa) politicians